Cardinal Andrea della Valle (29 November 1463, in Rome – 3 August 1534) was an Italian clergyman and art collector.

Life

Andrea belonged to an ancient family of Roman nobles. He was the son of Filippo della Valle, a Roman patrician; the family tomb is in Santa Maria in Aracoeli, where an inscription to their father was placed by Andrea and his brother Bartolomeo. Andrea also had a sister, Sigismonda.

Andrea was elected bishop of Crotone in 1496. In 1503-05 he directed the Apostolic Chancery, and served as Apostolic secretary during the pontificate of Pope Julius II. He was transferred to the titular diocese of Miletus in 1508,  which he resigned in favor of his nephew Quinzio Rustici on 26 November 1523. He participated in the Fifth Lateran Council, 1512, and was created cardinal priest in the consistory of 1 July 1517. He participated in the conclaves of 1521-22 and 1523. As archpriest of the patriarchal Liberian basilica (1520) he ceremonially opened and closed the Holy Door in the Jubilee Year of 1525.

Art collector
Cardinal della Valle is best remembered, however, as the collector of one of the first collections of Roman antiquities that marked the High Renaissance. He inherited some antiquities, which had been collected by the della Valle in the previous century, according to Vasari. and eagerly acquired more. Inspired by the Cortile del Belvedere, in 1520 he commissioned the Rafaellesque sculptor architect Lorenzetto Lotti to create a suitable setting for the sculptures and inscriptions and other antiquities that he had amassed, the result of a generation of rediscoveries at the turn of the 16th century. On the main floor of the palazzo's new second inner courtyard the sculptures were displayed in a sort of loggia, described by Giorgio Vasari as a hortus pensilis or hanging garden (giardino di sopra) that included planted raised boxes and an aviary, which "blurred the distinction between garden and courtyard," with inscriptions inviting peace, relaxation and thought, an invocation of rus in urbe. The architectural framing and the great care with which the ensemble was presented— as decorative as it was scholarly, evoking Classical harmony, symmetry and equilibrium, was a model for other Roman collections. Many visitors left written impressions during the 16th century, and more than one artist made sketches.

 
Maarten van Heemskerck's early drawing of the loggia, showing the two famous armless satyrs supporting baskets on their heads, set against the piers of the arches, was etched by Hieronymus Cock in 1558 and circulated among connoisseurs of the Antique. Here, in the serene and ordered presentation that was eventually developed in the 1520s and 30s by Lorenzetto— Heemskerck's drawing still shows a picturesque disorder— were undertaken the first systematic restorations and completions of Roman sculptural fragments, work that, according to Vasari's anecdotes, had occasionally been undertaken piecemeal for the Medici by Donatello and Verrocchio, but which became common practice and developed into a Roman industry during the sixteenth century; Vasari, following his description of della Valle's antiquities, remarks, "And to tell the truth, these antiquities restored in this manner have much more grace than those mutilated trunks, members without heads or figures defective and incomplete in any other way".

At his death the Palazzo Valle passed to his nephew, Camillo Capranica, of another antiquities-collecting family and gained the name Palazzo Valle-Capranica, while the collection was housed separately, in the palazzo of bishop Bruto Della Valle; there it was inspected by Gabriele Simeoni in 1557, who left descriptions in French and Italian. In 1584 the collection was purchased en bloc by Cardinal Ferdinand de' Medici and dispersed among various Medici dwellings. Most of the collection is at the Villa de Medici in Rome, but part was transferred to Florence, where della Valle sculptures can be seen today in the Palazzo Pitti and the Boboli Gardens, in the Uffizi, and at the Medici villa at Poggio Imperiale.

A theatre was built in the Cardinal's courtyard, which gave its name to the via Teatro Valle.

References

Bibliothèque nationale de France: "Dessins de la Renaissance" Two drawings of the collection at Palazzo Valle, one by Martin Heemskerck (1498-1574), who was in Rome ca 1532– 1536, the other attributed to Hendrick van Cleve, ca 1550. Illustrated. (in French). Among identifiable pieces, the Marsyas of the Uffizi, the Apollo with Lyre of Poggio Imperiale, the Minerva of Palazzo Pitti and others.

1463 births
1534 deaths
Clergy from Rome
16th-century Italian cardinals
Cardinal-bishops of Albano
Cardinal-bishops of Palestrina
16th-century Italian Roman Catholic bishops